Faizul Hasan was a Bangladeshi politician.

Biography 
Hasan was born into a Bengali Muslim family from Daubari in Gowainghat, Sylhet District. He was successful in a 1956 by-election for the East Bengal Legislative Assembly. Hasan participated in the 1973 Bangladeshi general election as a National Awami Party candidate but reached third place, losing to Habibur Rahman of the Awami League.

References 

People of East Pakistan
People from Gowainghat Upazila
20th-century Bengalis